Fly on the Wall is the fourth album by American R&B singer Bobby V, and his second album released through his own Blu Kolla Dreams label via Capitol Records. It was released on March 22, 2011. The album production from long-time collaborators Tim & Bob, as well as Bryan-Michael Cox, The Pentagon (an Underdogs offshoot), Jazze Pha, LOS Da Mystro, and Bobby V himself. The album features guest rappers 50 Cent, Lloyd Banks, Cyhi Da Prynce, Plies & Twista. The album debuted at No. 9 on the US Billboard 200 chart, with first-week sales of 38,000 copies in the United States and fell to No. 60 in its following week.

Singles
The first single released from the album was Phone # on July 6, 2010. The song featured rapper Plies and was produced by Jazze Pha. Reaching #55 on Billboard RnB and Hip-Hop charts. The second single was Words, released December 3, 2010 and produced by The Pentagon. Words reached #23 on Billboard RnB and Hip-Hop charts. The official remix to Words features R&B singer R. Kelly. The third single is a remake Bobby Brown's 1989 hit Rock Wit'cha, released February 15, 2011. The pair performed together on Lopez Tonight on February 23, 2011. The 4th single is "Grab Somebody" featuring Twista.

Track listing

Charts

Weekly charts

Year-end charts

References

2011 albums
Bobby V albums
Albums produced by Tim & Bob
Albums produced by Bryan-Michael Cox
Albums produced by Hit-Boy
Albums produced by Jazze Pha